Conan and the Young Warriors is a 1994 American television animated series produced by Sunbow Entertainment and aired by CBS as a sequel to the animated series Conan the Adventurer, but featuring a different set of characters (besides Conan). The series was developed by Michael Reaves and directed by John Grusd. It lasted only for one season of 13 episodes.

Plot
With Wrath-Amon vanquished and his family returned to life from living stone, Conan thought that his questing had finished. However, now he has to train and protect the "Chosen Ones", a trio of new young warriors who are in possession of magical "star stones", until the time comes in which they are destined to rule over Hyboria.

Aside from Conan's character design, which is identical to the one in Conan the Adventurer, this series has a few small links to its predecessor. Occasionally, a trumpet line piece of background music mirroring the theme to Conan the Adventurer is used. At one point, a character uses Zulu's trademark sign of Jhebbal Sag to summon animals to help them. Conan once seeks out a wizard he claims "Grey Wolf of Xanthus" told him about; he also mentions that he once knew a firebird, and jokingly claims that he ate him. The fact that Conan's sword is made of metal from the stars is mentioned several times, a reference to the original series in which a major theme was that Conan's sword was made of a magical star metal.

Characters
 Conan (voiced by Phil Hayes) – Largely the same as in Conan the Adventurer, Conan is charged with bringing up the three Chosen Ones and helping them fulfill their destinies.
 Epimetrius the Sage – He is the only other character from Conan the Adventurer to appear in this series aside from Conan. It was he who chose Draegen, Brynne and Navah as the users of the starstones. Empimetrius assisted Conan in guiding the Chosen Ones.
 Draegen (voiced by Mark Hildreth) – The oldest of the Chosen Ones, he grew up in Aquilonia. The star stone on his bandana allows him to magically don a suit of invincible armor.
 Brynne (voiced by Kelly Sheridan) – The middle Chosen One who grew up as a thief in Shadizar. The star stone that is the jewel of her ring allows her to create illusions.
 Navah (voiced by Chiara Zanni) – At eight years old, the youngest of the Chosen Ones. He grew up in the Pict Eagle tribe, and the star stone in his pendant allows him to take control of animals, specifically his mongoose Tiki.
 Sulinara (voiced by Kathleen Barr) – The power-hungry, part-Serpent Man sorceress who is the primary villain of the series. She will stop at nothing to possess all of the star stones, and thereby rule Hyboria by herself.
 Graak (voiced by Michael Donovan) – The winged demon that aids Sulinara in her attempts to steal the star stones, although he cannot touch either them or Conan's star metal sword.

Episodes

 "The Third Talisman" (written by Michael Reaves) - The evil sorceress Sulinara plans to steal the three star stones belonging to Conan's young friends.
 "Arena" (written by Steve Perry) - Conan and his friends attempt to free a city from an evil king, but the tyrant captures Conan and leaves him in the arena to compete in a fight to the death.
 "Dreamweaver" (written by Brynne Stephens) - Sulinara sends nightmares upon the children, as she wants to get to the precious stones.
 "Carnival of Cardolus" (written by Brynne Stephens) - Conan and his charges are looking for a basilisk, scales of which are an effective means against all poisons, but an unscrupulous circus owner is also after the curious animal.
 "Isle of the Lost" (written by David Wise) - Sulinara is seeking a precious stone that has the power to transform people into mindless monsters.
 "Covenant" (written by Len Wein) - Sulinara conjures the demon lord Demonicus to get the star-stones of Conan's young friends – in return, he can take revenge on Conan, against whom he has once suffered a bitter defeat.
 "Wolf in the Fold" (written by Michael Reaves and Steve Perry) - An earthquake awakens the shapeshifter that was sealed beneath the ruins where Conan and the children reside.
 "Once a Thief"  (written by Bryce Malek and David Wise) - Loki manipulates Brynne into stealing his hammer back from the King of Shadizar.
 "Brothers of the Sword" (written by Michael Reaves) - Conan reluctantly works with the shaman of Navah's Pict tribe to stop a possessed old ally from resurrecting a monster called the Unitaur.
 "Feet of Clay" (written by Bryce Malek) - A sorcerer steals a mystical shield that was being guarded by Draegen's cowardly former mentor, Commander Horus.
 "The Hand of Fate" (written by Brynne Stephens) - The Young Warriors encounter Tisara, a beautiful trained warrior with skills beyond their own.  She claims that Brynne, an admitted former thief, stole the star stone that was rightfully hers. 
 "The Separation"  (written by Michael Reaves) - Epimetrius informs Conan that his time with the Young Warriors is at an end, and that they will now be mentored by Ninjus. Ninjus is actually a servant of Necromas, an evil deity who has enslaved Epimetrius.
 "The Night of the Serpent" (written by Lydia C. Marano and Brynne Stephens) - Draegen falls in love with a princess who a prophecy alleges will marry a descendant of Set.

Home video release
Eight episodes were released over four DVD volumes by MRA Entertainment in Australia, followed by a DVD pack containing the four DVD volumes:

Reception
According to The A.V. Club, this cartoon, like its predecessor, "has been significantly defanged, dumbing down and infantilizing the character to the degree that he’s robbed of his savage appeal". In 2009, Topless Robot featured the "Cartoon Conan" from this show on the list of "The 8 Dumbest Barbarian Heroes".

References

External links 
 

1990s American animated television series
1994 American television series debuts
1994 American television series endings
American children's animated action television series
American children's animated adventure television series
American children's animated fantasy television series
American sequel television series
Animated television series about children
English-language television shows
CBS original programming
Conan the Barbarian television series
Television series by Sunbow Entertainment
Television series by Claster Television